Johann Friedrich Peter (sometimes John Frederick Peter) (May 19, 1746 – July 13, 1813) was an American composer of German origin.

Bio 
Johann Friedrich Peter was born on May 19, 1746, in Heerendijk, Holland, to German parents Susannah Peter and Moravian pastor John Frederick Peter. Peter was educated in Holland and Germany before coming to America with his brother Simon in 1770. He began to compose music for the church shortly after his arrival in America, and for a time, served as an organist and violinist in the Moravian congregations of Nazareth, Bethlehem and Lititz in Pennsylvania. In 1780, he moved to Salem, North Carolina, and received his ordination as a Moravian deacon on September 16 of that year.

He married Catharina Leinbach in 1786 in Salem, North Carolina and lived there until their departure in 1790.

All of Peter's known compositions are sacred concerted vocal works or anthems composed for worship services with the exception of the string quintets. His six string quintets for two violins, two violas, and a violoncello are among the earliest examples of chamber music known by a North American composer. The six string quintets, performed by the American Moravian Chamber Ensemble, were recorded and published in 1997 on New World Records .  He wrote a symphony "sinfonia in G" with four movements.

References

Liner notes to String Chamber Music in the Moravian Musical Heritage by New World Records
Autobiographical text

External links
 

1746 births
1813 deaths
American male composers
American composers
German emigrants to the United States